Ojingeo-chae-bokkeum is a bokkeum (stir-fried dish) made with dried shredded squid—called ojingeo-chae in Korean— and gochujang-based sauce. Like other dry banchan (side dish), it can be stored for a long time and retain its taste.

Preparation 
Dried shredded squid are cut into short pieces, stir-fried in oil, and coated with the sauce mixture made by mixing and boiling gochujang (chili paste), sugar, rice cooking wine, and water. Sesame oil and toasted sesame seeds are sprinkled on top when served.

Photos

References 

Banchan
Squid dishes